In geometry, the neusis is a geometric construction method that was used in antiquity by Greek mathematicians.

Geometric construction 
The neusis construction consists of fitting a line element of given length in between two given lines ( and ), in such a way that the line element, or its extension, passes through a given point .

Point  is called the pole of the neusis, line  the directrix, or guiding line, and line  the catch line. Length  is called the diastema.

A neusis construction might be performed by means of a marked ruler that is rotatable around the point  (this may be done by putting a pin into the point  and then pressing the ruler against the pin). In the figure one end of the ruler is marked with a yellow eye with crosshairs: this is the origin of the scale division on the ruler. A second marking on the ruler (the blue eye) indicates the distance  from the origin. The yellow eye is moved along line , until the blue eye coincides with line . The position of the line element thus found is shown in the figure as a dark blue bar.

Use of the neusis 
Neuseis have been important because they sometimes provide a means to solve geometric problems that are not solvable by means of compass and straightedge alone. Examples are the trisection of any angle in three equal parts, and the doubling of the cube. Mathematicians such as Archimedes of Syracuse (287–212 BC) and Pappus of Alexandria (290–350 AD) freely used neuseis; Sir Isaac Newton (1642–1726) followed their line of thought, and also used neusis constructions. Nevertheless, gradually the technique dropped out of use.

Regular polygons 
Of all prime-power polygons below the 100-gon, this is enough to show that the regular 23-, 29-, 43-, 47-, 49-, 53-, 59-, 67-, 71-, 79-, 83-, and 89-gons cannot be constructed with neusis. (If a regular p-gon is constructible, then  is constructible, and in these cases p − 1 has a prime factor higher than 5.) The 3-, 4-, 5-, 8-, 16-, 17-, 32-, and 64-gons can be constructed with only a straightedge and compass, and the 7-, 9-, 13-, 19-, 27-, 37-, 73-, 81-, and 97-gons with angle trisection. However, it is not known in general if all quintics (fifth-order polynomials) have neusis-constructible roots, which is relevant for the 11-, 25-, 31-, 41-, and 61-gons. Benjamin and Snyder showed in 2014 that the regular 11-gon is neusis-constructible; the 25-, 31-, 41-, and 61-gons remain open problems. More generally, the constructibility of all powers of 5 greater than 5 itself by marked ruler and compass is an open problem, along with all primes greater than 11 of the form p = 2r3s5t + 1 where t > 0 (all prime numbers that are greater than 11 and equal to one more than a regular number that is divisible by 10).

Waning popularity 
T. L. Heath, the historian of mathematics, has suggested that the Greek mathematician Oenopides (ca. 440 BC) was the first to put compass-and-straightedge constructions above neuseis. The principle to avoid neuseis whenever possible may have been spread by Hippocrates of Chios (ca. 430 BC), who originated from the same island as Oenopides, and who was—as far as we know—the first to write a systematically ordered geometry textbook. One hundred years after him Euclid too shunned neuseis in his very influential textbook, The Elements.

The next attack on the neusis came when, from the fourth century BC, Plato's idealism gained ground. Under its influence a hierarchy of three classes of geometrical constructions was developed. Descending from the "abstract and noble" to the "mechanical and earthly", the three classes were:
constructions with straight lines and circles only (compass and straightedge);
 constructions that in addition to this use conic sections (ellipses, parabolas, hyperbolas);
 constructions that needed yet other means of construction, for example neuseis.

In the end the use of neusis was deemed acceptable only when the two other, higher categories of constructions did not offer a solution. Neusis became a kind of last resort that was invoked only when all other, more respectable, methods had failed. Using neusis where other construction methods might have been used was branded by the late Greek mathematician Pappus of Alexandria (ca. 325 AD) as "a not inconsiderable error".

See also 

 Angle trisection
 Constructible polygon
 Pierpont prime
 Quadratrix
 Steel square
 Tomahawk (geometry)
 Trisectrix

References

R. Boeker, 'Neusis', in: Paulys Realencyclopädie der Classischen Altertumswissenschaft, G. Wissowa red. (1894–), Supplement 9 (1962) 415–461.–In German. The most comprehensive survey; however, the author sometimes has rather curious opinions.
T. L. Heath, A history of Greek Mathematics (2 volumes; Oxford 1921).
H. G. Zeuthen, Die Lehre von den Kegelschnitten im Altertum [= The Theory of Conic Sections in Antiquity] (Copenhagen 1886; reprinted Hildesheim 1966).

External links 

 MathWorld page
 Angle Trisection by Paper Folding

Euclidean plane geometry